Narek Grigoryan (born 17 June 2001) is an Armenian professional footballer who plays as a forward for Urartu.

International career
He represented Armenia at the 2019 UEFA European Under-19 Championship.

He made his debut for Armenia national team on 11 November 2021 in a World Cup qualifier against North Macedonia.

References

External links
 

2001 births
Footballers from Yerevan
Living people
Armenian footballers
Armenia youth international footballers
Armenia under-21 international footballers
Armenia international footballers
Association football forwards
FC Urartu players
BKMA Yerevan players
Jagiellonia Białystok players
Armenian Premier League players
Armenian First League players
Ekstraklasa players
III liga players
Armenian expatriate footballers
Expatriate footballers in Poland
Armenian expatriate sportspeople in Poland